Gram Salkia  is a village in the Burwan CD block in the Kandi subdivision of Murshidabad district in the state of West Bengal, India.

Geography

Location

Area overview
The area shown in the map alongside, covering Berhampore and Kandi subdivisions, is spread across both the natural physiographic regions of the district, Rarh and Bagri. The headquarters of Murshidabad district, Berhampore, is in this area. The entire area is overwhelmingly rural with over 80% of the population living in the rural areas.

Note: The map alongside presents some of the notable locations in the subdivisions. All places marked in the map are linked in the larger full screen map.

Demographics
According to the 2011 Census of India, Gram Salkia had a total population of 3,087, of which 1,581 (51%) were males and 1,506 (49%) were females. Population in the age range 0–6 years was 401. The total number of literate persons in Gram Salkia was 1,913 (71.22% of the population over 6 years).

Civic administration

CD block HQ
The headquarters of Burwan CD block are located at Gram Salkia.

Transport
Gram Salkia is on Gramshalika Dak Bangla-Ekghoria-Kandi Road, which links it to State Highway 7 running from Rajgram (in Birbhum district) to Midnapore (in Paschim Medinipur district).

References

Villages in Murshidabad district